Geographical Indications in Indonesia are a form of intellectual property consisting of an "indication which identifies goods and/or a product as originating from a particular region of which its geographical environment factors including nature, labor, or combination of both factors are attributable to a given reputation, quality, and characteristics of the produced goods and/or product". Geographical indications can be registered based on the Law on Marks and Geographical Indications Foreign geographical indications can only be registered if they are recognised or registered there. As of August 2021, 93 Indications have been registered.

Registered Geographical Indications
As of August 2021, 93 Geographical Indications had been registered, most of which originating from Indonesia. The list of Indonesian GIs is shown below:

Protection outside Indonesia
Kopi Arabika Gayo is (in addition of its status as Geographical Indication in Indonesia) also register as a Protected Geographical Indication in the European Union as well as the UK. Bali Amed salt / garam Amed Bali has been registered as a Protected Designation of Origin in the European Union.

In the framework of negotiations between the European Union and Indonesia on a Free Trade Agreement, in 2019, 47 products were suggested to be eligible for protection after entry into force of that agreement in the future, followed by two more in 2021: Kopi Robusta Pagar Alam and Salak Sibetan Karangasem Bali.

See also
100% Cinta Indonesia

References

Geographical indications